A Gugelhupf (also Kugelhupf, Guglhupf, Gugelhopf, and, in France, kouglof , kougelhof, or kougelhopf) is a cake traditionally baked in a distinctive ring pan, similar to Bundt cake, but leavened with baker's yeast. 

There are three main types: cocoa; plain with a hint of vanilla and lemon zest; and a marbled combination of the two. It is popular in a wide region of Central Europe particularly in southern Germany, Alsace, Austria, Switzerland, Romania, Croatia, Hungary, Bosnia, Serbia, Slovakia, Slovenia, Czech Republic, and Poland. In the cuisine of the Pennsylvania Dutch it is known as Deitscher Kuche (German cake).
 
In late Medieval Austria, a Gugelhupf was served at major community events such as weddings, and was decorated with flowers, leaves, candles, and seasonal fruits.  The name persisted through the Austro-Hungarian Empire, eventually becoming standardized in Viennese cookbooks as a refined, rich cake, flavored with rosewater and almond.  Many regional variations exist, testifying to the widespread popularity of the Gugelhupf tradition. Several narratives claim the origin of the cake in Roman times with a spurious claim relating even further back to the Three Wise Men. The cake was popularized as a prestige pastry by Emperor Franz Joseph of Austria and was popularized in France by Marie-Antoinette.

The Gugelhupf was the sweet chosen to represent Austria in the Café Europe initiative of the Austrian presidency of the European Union, on Europe Day 2006.

Etymology

The word's origin is disputed.

The old, South German name combines the Middle High German words Gugel (see also gugel, a long-pointed hood) derived from Latin cucullus, meaning hood or bonnet, and Hupf, which literally means "to hop" or "to jump". The Brothers Grimm wrote that the hupf may be a reference to the "jumping" of the dough caused by the yeast, but no firm etymological evidence exists for this.  The earliest known Gugelhupf recipe, in Marx Rumpolt's 1581 cookbook, describes a "Hat Cake" with the distinctive shape and ornamentation recommendation, suggesting a similarity or intentional imitation of the shape of a medieval hat.

In Upper Austria it is known as Wacker or Wacka. It is called  in Czech and Slovak, and babka in Polish.

Description

Gugelhupf is made with a soft yeast dough, baked in a high, creased, toroidal pan. Depending on the region it can contain raisins, almonds or sometimes also Kirschwasser cherry brandy.  Traditional Gugelhupf always contains some dried fruit, usually raisins, and sometimes other dried fruits like sour cherries can be soaked in orange juice or liquor. Some regional varieties (Czech, Hungarian and Slovak) are filled with a layer of sweetened ground poppy seeds or chocolate filling similar to Jewish babka.

It is not closely related to the Christmas cake in Italy known as the pandoro nor to the American Bundt cake as that is not yeast based. Sometimes a regular pound cake or a marble cake made without yeast but baked in a Gugelhupf pan is also called Gugelhupf.

See also
 List of almond dishes
 Coffee cake
 Nut roll
 Savarin
 Brioche

References

Works cited

External links
 
 
 Sample recipe
 Picture of a Marmorgugelhupf

Sweet breads
Alsatian cuisine
German cakes
Swiss cuisine
Czech cuisine
Serbian cuisine
Slovak cuisine
Slovenian desserts
Croatian cuisine
Croatian desserts
Macedonian cuisine
Hungarian desserts
Almond dishes
Yeast cakes
Austrian cakes